Stumpffia tridactyla is a species of frog in the family Microhylidae.
It is endemic to Madagascar.
Its natural habitats are subtropical or tropical moist lowland forests, subtropical or tropical moist montane forests, and plantations.

Sources

References

Stumpffia
Amphibians described in 1975
Endemic frogs of Madagascar
Taxa named by Jean Marius René Guibé
Taxonomy articles created by Polbot